Anett Schuck (born 11 April 1970 in Leipzig, Sachsen) is a German sprint canoer and marathon canoeist who competed from the early 1990s to the early 2000s (decade). Competing in two Summer Olympics, she won two gold medals in the K-4 500 m event, earning them in 1996 and 2000.

Schuck also won twenty medals at the ICF Canoe Sprint World Championships with twelve golds (K-2 200 m: 1997, K-2 500 m: 1995, 1997; K-2 5000 m: 1990, 1991, 1993; K-4 200 m: 1997, K-4 500 m: 1993, 1994, 1995, 1997, 1998), six silvers (K-2 500 m: 1998, K-4 200 m: 1994, 1995; K-4 500 m: 1999, 2001, 2002), and a bronze (K-2 500 m: 1993, K-4 200 m: 2002).

References
DatabaseOlympics.com profile

1970 births
Canoeists at the 1996 Summer Olympics
Canoeists at the 2000 Summer Olympics
German female canoeists
Living people
Olympic canoeists of Germany
Olympic gold medalists for Germany
Sportspeople from Leipzig
Olympic medalists in canoeing
ICF Canoe Sprint World Championships medalists in kayak
Medalists at the 2000 Summer Olympics
Medalists at the 1996 Summer Olympics
20th-century German women
21st-century German women